Mardu is a small dispersed village in Shropshire, England. It is located a mile northwest of the village of Whitcott Keysett.

The nearest town is Clun. The village lies at 246m above sea level.

Offa's Dyke Path runs through the village.

External links

Villages in Shropshire